Karsten Stenersen (born 24 September 1971) is a Norwegian former cyclist. He competed in two events at the 1992 Summer Olympics, placing eleventh in the time trial. He is the brother of Bjørn Stenersen.

References

External links
 

1971 births
Living people
Norwegian male cyclists
Olympic cyclists of Norway
Cyclists at the 1992 Summer Olympics
Sportspeople from Bergen